Fränz Ehringer (18 November 1928 – 20 May 1987) was a Luxembourgian boxer. He competed in the men's lightweight event at the 1948 Summer Olympics. In his first fight, he lost to Raul Zumbano of Brazil.

References

1928 births
1987 deaths
Luxembourgian male boxers
Olympic boxers of Luxembourg
Boxers at the 1948 Summer Olympics
Sportspeople from Esch-sur-Alzette
Lightweight boxers